SD Worx is a professional cycling team based in the Netherlands, which competes in elite road bicycle racing events such as the UCI Women's World Tour.

Between 2012 and 2020, the team's title sponsors were the Dutch equipment rental company Boels Rental and Dolmans Landscaping, a Dutch civil engineering company. Both companies terminated their title sponsorship of the team at the end of the 2020 season. In February 2020, it was announced that Belgian human resource services company  would become the title sponsor of the team on a four-year deal from 2021.

History

2013

2014

On March 1 Sanne van Paassen joined the team. After winning the Omloop van het Hageland in early March, Lizzie Armitstead also won the first World Cup race, the Ronde van Drenthe. She would finish later three times in second place in the later World Cup races and keeping the lead in the overall World Cup classification.

2015

The team started the season with the Ladies Tour of Qatar. Ellen van Dijk won the second stage and took the lead in the general classification.

2016
The team also extended the contracts of Megan Guarnier, Chantal Blaak, Christine Majerus, Amalie Dideriksen, Nikki Brammeier, Lizzie Armitstead and Karol-Ann Canuel. Ellen Van Dijk left the team to join Team Liv–Plantur. On 11 August, Evelyn Stevens announced she would retire at the end of the season.

Team roster

Major wins

2010
 Noord-Nederland Regional Road Race Championships, Janneke Ensing
2011
Halle-Buizingen, Martine Bras
Bredene, Winanda Spoor
 Noord-Nederland Regional Time Trial Championships, Janneke Ensing
 Oost-Nederland Regional Road Race, Geerike Schreurs
Stage 4 Tour de Feminin — Krasna Lipa, Mascha Pijnenborg
Stage 3 Tour Féminin en Limousin, Martine Bras
2012
Tour de Free State, Laura van der Kamp
2013
 Provincial Time Trial Championship (Limburg), Jessie Daams
 Combativity award Stage 2 Energiewacht Tour, Lizzie Armitstead
 Sprints classification Holland Ladies Tour, Lizzie Armitstead
 Combination classification, Lizzie Armitstead
2014
Omloop van het Hageland, Lizzie Armitstead
Ronde van Drenthe World Cup, Lizzie Armitstead
Tour of Flanders, Ellen van Dijk
Otley Grand Prix, Lizzie Armitstead
Profronde van Heerlen, Ellen van Dijk
 Points classification Internationale Thüringen Rundfahrt der Frauen, Lizzie Armitstead
 Mountains classification, Lizzie Armitstead
 Stage 2 Combativity award, Romy Kasper
Stage 1, Lizzie Armitstead
Stage 2, Romy Kasper
 Overall UCI Women's Road World Cup, Lizzie Armitstead
Stage 1 (ITT) Holland Ladies Tour, Ellen van Dijk
Grand Prix Galychyna (Scratch race), Katarzyna Pawłowska
Grand Prix Galychyna (Omnium), Katarzyna Pawłowska
2015
Revolution – Manchester (Round 3) (Points race), Lizzie Armitstead
Revolution – Glasgow (Round 4) (Points race), Lizzie Armitstead
 Overall Ladies Tour of Qatar, Lizzie Armitstead
 Points classification, Lizzie Armitstead
Stage 2, Ellen van Dijk
Stages 3 & 4, Lizzie Armitstead
Le Samyn des Dames, Chantal Blaak
Strade Bianche, Megan Guarnier
Trofeo Alfredo Binda-Comune di Cittiglio, Lizzie Armitstead
Tour of California Women's Time Trial, Evelyn Stevens
Holland Hills Classic, Lizzie Armitstead
Philadelphia Cycling Classic, Lizzie Armitstead
Stage 1 Emakumeen Euskal Bira, Megan Guarnier
Stage 3 Emakumeen Euskal Bira, Chantal Blaak
Stage 1 The Women's Tour, Lizzie Armitstead
Stage 3 The Women's Tour, Christine Majerus
Stage 2 Giro d'Italia Femminile, Megan Guarnier
Mountains classification Tour de Bretagne Féminin, Christine Majerus
2016
Stage 2 Ladies Tour of Qatar, Ellen van Dijk
Omloop Het Nieuwsblad, Lizzie Armitstead
Strade Bianche, Lizzie Armitstead
Le Samyn des Dames, Chantal Blaak
Ronde van Drenthe, Chantal Blaak
Trofeo Alfredo Binda-Comune di Cittiglio, Lizzie Armitstead
Tour of Flanders, Lizzie Armitstead
Gent–Wevelgem, Chantal Blaak
 Overall Energiewacht Tour, Ellen van Dijk
Team classification
Stage 1, Team time trial
Stage 2, Chantal Blaak
Stage 4b (ITT), Ellen van Dijk
 Overall Tour of California, Megan Guarnier
 Points classification, Megan Guarnier
Stage 1, Megan Guarnier
Holland Hills Classic, Lizzie Armitstead
Philadelphia International Cycling Classic, Megan Guarnier
 Overall The Women's Tour, Lizzie Armitstead
 Best British rider classification, Lizzie Armitstead
Stage 1, Christine Majerus
Stage 3, Lizzie Armitstead
 Overall Giro d'Italia Femminile, Megan Guarnier
Stages 2, 6 & 7 (ITT), Evelyn Stevens
Stage 4 (ITT) Thüringen Rundfahrt der Frauen, Ellen van Dijk
Crescent Women World Cup Vårgårda TTT, Team time trial
 Overall UCI Women's World Tour, Megan Guarnier
Stage 1 Holland Ladies Tour, Amalie Dideriksen
Stage 2 Holland Ladies Tour, Team time trial
Stages 1 & 2 Tour Cycliste Féminin International de l'Ardèche, Katarzyna Pawłowska
2017
Ronde van Drenthe, Amy Pieters
Stage 1b Healthy Ageing Tour, Amy Pieters
Stage 2 Healthy Ageing Tour, Team time trial
Stage 4 Healthy Ageing Tour, Chantal Blaak
Amstel Gold Race, Anna van der Breggen
La Flèche Wallonne Féminine, Anna van der Breggen
Liège–Bastogne–Liège Femmes, Anna van der Breggen
Women's Tour de Yorkshire, Lizzie Deignan
 Overall Grand Prix Elsy Jacobs, Christine Majerus
Stage 1, Christine Majerus
 Overall Tour of California, Anna van der Breggen
Stage 1, Megan Guarnier
 Zuid-Holland Regional Time Trial Championships, Chantal Blaak
Stage 2 The Women's Tour, Amy Pieters
 Overall Giro d'Italia Femminile, Anna van der Breggen
Stage 1, Team time trial
Stage 10, Megan Guarnier
Daags na de Tour, Chantal Blaak
Paardenmarktronde van Alblasserdam, Chantal Blaak
CityRonde Tiel, Chantal Blaak
Crescent Vårgårda TTT, Team time trial
Stage 3 Ladies Tour of Norway, Megan Guarnier
 Young rider classification Holland Ladies Tour, Demi de Jong
Team classification
Stage 5, Anna van der Breggen
 Overall UCI Women's World Tour, Anna van der Breggen
2018
Strade Bianche Donne, Anna van der Breggen
Ronde van Drenthe, Amy Pieters
Tour of Flanders for Women, Anna van der Breggen
 Overall Healthy Ageing Tour, Amy Pieters
Team classification
Stage 1 (ITT), Anna van der Breggen
Stage 2, Amy Pieters
Amstel Gold Race, Chantal Blaak
La Flèche Wallonne Féminine, Anna van der Breggen
Liège–Bastogne–Liège Femmes, Anna van der Breggen
Stage 1 Festival Elsy Jacobs, Christine Majerus
 Overall Women's Tour de Yorkshire, Megan Guarnier
 Mountains classification, Megan Guarnier
Stage 2, Megan Guarnier
Durango-Durango Emakumeen Saria, Anna van der Breggen
Stage 3 Emakumeen Euskal Bira, Amy Pieters
Stage 4 The Women's Tour, Amalie Dideriksen
Crescent Vårgårda TTT, Team time trial
GP de Plouay – Bretagne, Amy Pieters
Stages 3 & 4 Holland Ladies Tour, Amalie Dideriksen
Stage 5 Holland Ladies Tour, Chantal Blaak
2019
Omloop Het Nieuwsblad, Chantal Blaak
Le Samyn, Jip van den Bos
La Flèche Wallonne Féminine, Anna van der Breggen
 Points classification Women's Tour de Yorkshire, Christine Majerus
 Overall Tour of California, Anna van der Breggen
 Sprint classification, Anna van der Breggen
Stage 1, Anna van der Breggen
Stage 2, Katie Hall
Stage 1 Emakumeen Euskal Bira, Jolien D'Hoore
Stages 1 & 3 The Women's Tour, Jolien D'Hoore
Stage 6 The Women's Tour, Amy Pieters
Stage 9 Giro Rosa, Anna van der Breggen
GP de Plouay – Bretagne, Anna van der Breggen
Overall Holland Ladies Tour, Christine Majerus
Team classification
Grand Prix International d'Isbergues, Christine Majerus
2020
 Overall Setmana Ciclista Valenciana, Anna van der Breggen
Stage 2, Anna van der Breggen
La Flèche Wallonne Féminine, Anna van der Breggen
Le Samyn, Chantal Blaak
 Overall Giro Rosa, Anna van der Breggen
Gent–Wevelgem, Jolien D'Hoore
Tour of Flanders, Chantal van den Broek-Blaak
2021
Omloop Het Nieuwsblad, Anna van der Breggen
Strade Bianche, Chantal van den Broek-Blaak
Stage 1 Healthy Ageing Tour, Jolien D'Hoore
Stage 3 Healthy Ageing Tour, Lonneke Uneken
Nokere Koerse, Amy Pieters
Omloop van de Westhoek – Memorial Stive Vermaut, Christine Majerus
La Flèche Wallonne Féminine, Anna van der Breggen
Liège–Bastogne–Liège Femmes, Demi Vollering
Gran Premio Ciudad de Eibar, Anna van der Breggen
Durango-Durango Emakumeen Saria, Anna van der Breggen
Dwars door het Hageland WE, Chantal van den Broek-Blaak
La Course by Le Tour de France, Demi Vollering
 Overall Giro Rosa, Anna van der Breggen
Stages 1 & 4 (ITT), Anna van der Breggen
Stage 9, Ashleigh Moolman
Stage 3 BeNe Ladies Tour, Lonneke Uneken
 Overall Holland Ladies Tour, Chantal van den Broek-Blaak
Stage 3, Lonneke Uneken
 Overall The Women's Tour, Demi Vollering
Stage 2, Amy Pieters
Stage 3, Demi Vollering
2022
Stage 2 Bloeizone Fryslân Tour, Lonneke Uneken
Strade Bianche, Lotte Kopecky
Drentse Acht van Westerveld, Christine Majerus
Tour of Flanders, Lotte Kopecky
Brabantse Pijl, Demi Vollering
 Youth classification Grand Prix Elsy Jacobs, Niamh Fisher-Black
  Overall Itzulia Women, Demi Vollering
 Points classification, Demi Vollering
 Youth classification, Niamh Fisher-Black
Stages 1, 2 & 3, Demi Vollering
 Points classification Vuelta a Burgos Feminas, Lotte Kopecky
 Mountains classification, Demi Vollering
Team classification
Stage 1, Lotte Kopecky
Stage 4, Demi Vollering
2023
Stage 2 UAE Tour Women, Lorena Wiebes
Omloop Het Nieuwsblad, Lotte Kopecky
Omloop van het Hageland, Lorena Wiebes

National, continental and world champions

2010
 Netherlands Track (Scratch race), Winanda Spoor
2012
 Azerbaijan Time Trial, Elena Tchalykh
2013
 British National Road Race, Lizzie Armitstead
2014
 Luxembourg Cyclo-cross, Christine Majerus
 Luxembourg Time Trial, Christine Majerus
 Luxembourg Road Race, Christine Majerus
2015
 Luxembourg Cyclo-cross, Christine Majerus
 Luxembourg Time Trial, Christine Majerus
 Luxembourg Road Race, Christine Majerus
 USA Road Race, Megan Guarnier
 Denmark Road Race, Amalie Dideriksen
 British Road Race, Lizzie Armitstead
 European U23 Track (Pursuit), Amalie Dideriksen
 European U23 Track (Omnium), Amalie Dideriksen
 World Road Race, Lizzie Armitstead
 European Track (Points race), Katarzyna Pawłowska
2016
 World Track (Points race), Katarzyna Pawłowska
 Luxembourg Cyclo-cross, Christine Majerus
 British Cyclo-cross, Nikki Harris
 USA Road Race, Megan Guarnier
 Luxembourg Time Trial, Christine Majerus
 Luxembourg Road Race, Christine Majerus
 European Time Trial, Ellen van Dijk
 World Road Race, Amalie Dideriksen
 Denmark Track (Omnium), Amalie Dideriksen
 Denmark Track (Points race), Amalie Dideriksen
 Denmark Track (Individual pursuit), Amalie Dideriksen
 Denmark Track (Scratch race), Amalie Dideriksen
 Denmark Track (Individual sprint), Amalie Dideriksen
2017
 Luxembourg Cyclo-cross, Christine Majerus
 British Cyclo-cross, Nikki Brammier
 Poland Time Trial, Katarzyna Pawłowska
 Luxembourg Time Trial, Christine Majerus
 British Road Race, Lizzie Armitstead
 Dutch Road Race, Chantal Blaak
 Luxembourg Road Race, Christine Majerus
 Canada Time Trial, Karol-Ann Canuel
 Denmark Track (Omnium), Amalie Dideriksen
 World Road Race, Chantal Blaak
 Poland Track (Omnium), Katarzyna Pawłowska
 Dutch Track (Individual pursuit), Amy Pieters
2018
 Luxembourg Cyclo-cross, Christine Majerus
 Luxembourg Time Trial, Christine Majerus
 Denmark Road Race, Amalie Dideriksen
 Dutch Road Race, Chantal Blaak
 Luxembourg Road Race, Christine Majerus
 World Road Race, Anna van der Breggen
 Dutch Track (Individual pursuit), Amy Pieters
2019
 Luxembourg Cyclo-cross, Christine Majerus
 European Track (Madison), Amalie Dideriksen
 World Track (Madison), Amy Pieters

2020
 Luxembourg Cyclo-cross, Christine Majerus
 Denmark Time Trial, Amalie Dideriksen
 Luxembourg Time Trial, Christine Majerus
 Luxembourg Road Race, Christine Majerus
 Dutch Road Race, Anna van der Breggen
 World Time Trial, Anna van der Breggen
 World Road Race, Anna van der Breggen
 World Track (Madison), Amy Pieters

2021
 Czech Time Trial, Nikola Nosková 
 Hungary Time Trial, Blanka Vas
 Luxembourg Time Trial, Christine Majerus
 Dutch Time Trial, Anna van der Breggen
 Dutch Road Race, Amy Pieters
 Hungary Road Race, Blanka Vas
 Luxembourg Road Race, Christine Majerus
 British U23 Time Trial, Anna Shackley
 World Track (Madison), Amy Pieters

2022
 Hungary Time Trial, Blanka Vas
 Belgium Time Trial, Lotte Kopecky

References

External links

 

Cycling teams based in the Netherlands
UCI Women's Teams
Cycling teams established in 2010